The Ireland women's national ice hockey team is the women's national ice hockey team of the Republic of Ireland. The team is controlled by the Irish Ice Hockey Association, a member of the International Ice Hockey Federation.  Until the Dundalk Ice Dome reopens they do not meet minimum IIHF standards for participation.

History
Ireland played its first game in 2011 during the 2011 Women's World Ice Hockey Championships – Division V tournament held in Sofia, Bulgaria. They competed against Bulgaria, Poland, Spain, and Turkey. Their first game of the tournament was against Poland which they went on to lose 23–0, which would also be their largest recorded loss. Ireland lost all of the other three games of the tournament, finishing last in the group. The following year Ireland competed in the 2013 IIHF Women's World Championship Division II Group B Qualification tournament against Bulgaria and Turkey. Ireland lost both of its games and failed to qualify for the 2014 IIHF Women's World Championship Division II Group B tournament.

International competitions

World Championship
2011 IIHF Women's World Championships. Finish: 5th in Division V (35th overall)
2013 IIHF Women's World Championships. Finish: 3rd in Division II Group B Qualification (35th overall)

IIHF Women's Development Cup

Roster
From the 2013 IIHF Women's World Championships

All-time Record against other nations
As of 14 September 2011

See also
Ireland men's national ice hockey team

References

External links
Official website
IIHF profile

Ice hockey in Ireland
Ice hockey
Women's national ice hockey teams in Europe